Zsolt Varga (born March 9, 1972 in Budapest) is a Hungarian water polo player, who played on the golden medals squad at the 2000. He also participated in the 1996 Summer Olympics, where the Hungarian team placed 4th. He made his debut for the national side in 1990, at the European Nations Cup in Rome, Italy.

Honours

National
 Olympic Games:  Gold medal - 2000
 World Championships:  Silver medal - 1998
 European Championship:  Gold medal - 1997, 1999;  Silver medal - 1993, 1995;  Bronze medal - 2001
 Junior European Championship: (Bronze medal - 1988, 1990)

Club
European competitions: 
 Cup Winners' Cup Winners (1): (1999 - with Mladost)
Domestic competitions: 
 Hungarian Championship (OB I): 2x (1996, 1997 - with BVSC)
 Hungarian Cup (Magyar Kupa): 1x (1995 - with BVSC)
  Croatian Championship (Prva HVL): 1x (1999 - with Mladost)
  Croatian Cup (Kup Hrvatske): 2x (1998, 1999 - with Mladost)

Awards
 Youth water polo player of the year: 1989
 Member of the Hungarian team of year: 1993, 1997, 1999, 2000
 Hungarian Water Polo Player of the Year: 1996

Orders
   Officer's Cross of the Order of Merit of the Republic of Hungary (2000)

See also
 Hungary men's Olympic water polo team records and statistics
 List of Olympic champions in men's water polo
 List of Olympic medalists in water polo (men)
 List of world champions in men's water polo
 List of World Aquatics Championships medalists in water polo

References

External links
 

1972 births
Living people
Water polo players from Budapest
Hungarian male water polo players
Water polo centre forwards
Water polo players at the 1992 Summer Olympics
Water polo players at the 1996 Summer Olympics
Water polo players at the 2000 Summer Olympics
Medalists at the 2000 Summer Olympics
Olympic gold medalists for Hungary in water polo
World Aquatics Championships medalists in water polo
Hungarian water polo coaches
20th-century Hungarian people
21st-century Hungarian people